Katarina Osadchuk (born ) is an Australian female volleyball player. She is part of the Australia women's national volleyball team.

She participated in the 2014 FIVB Volleyball World Grand Prix.
On club level she played for ŁKS Łódź in 2015.

References

External links
 Profile at FIVB.org

1991 births
Living people
Australian women's volleyball players
Place of birth missing (living people)
Middle blockers
Expatriate volleyball players in Germany
Expatriate volleyball players in Poland
Australian expatriate sportspeople in Germany
Australian expatriate sportspeople in Poland
Australian expatriate volleyball players